Nimbarkacharya  ( 1130 –  1200), also known as Nimbarka, Nimbaditya or Niyamananda, was a Hindu philosopher, theologian and the chief proponent of the theology of Dvaitadvaita (dvaita–advaita) or dualistic–non-dualistic. He played a major role in spreading the worship of the divine couple Radha and Krishna, and founded Nimbarka Sampradaya, one of four main traditions of Hindu sect Vaishnavism.

Nimbarka is believed to have lived around the 11th and 12th centuries, but this dating has been questioned, suggesting that he lived somewhat earlier than Shankaracharya, in the 6th or 7th century CE. Born in Southern India in a Telugu Brahmin family, he spent most of his life in Mathura, Uttar Pradesh. He is sometimes identified with another philosopher named Bhaskara, but this is considered to be a misconception due to the differences between the spiritual views of the two saints.

Etymology and epithets
The word 'Nimbārka' (निंबार्क) is derived from two Sanskrit words  nimba (निम्ब) and arka (अर्क). It is believed that Nimbarka was given the name 'Niyamananda' at his birth. According to a folk tale, Niyamananda achieve the name Nimbarka because he trapped some rays of sunlight (arka) in the leaves of Neem (nimba). He was also referred as Nimbaditya by his followers. Sometimes Bhaskara is also considered his epithet because of the identification of Nimbarka with the philosopher Bhaskara. The tradition which he founded is named after him.

Datings
Nimbarka's traditional followers believe that he appeared in 3096 BCE, but this dating is controversial as historians believe that he lived between 7th and 11th century CE. According to Roma Bose, Nimbarka lived in the 13th century, on the presupposition that Śrī Nimbārkāchārya was the author of the work Madhvamukhamardana. Bhandarkar has placed him after Ramanuja, suggesting 1162 CE as the date of his demise. S. N. Dasgupta dated Nimbarka to around middle of 14th century, while S. A. A. Rizvi assigns a date of c.1130–1200 CE.

According to Satyanand, Bose's dating of the 13th century is an erroneous attribution. Malkovsky, following Satyanand, notes that in Bhandarkar's own work it is clearly stated that his dating of Nimbarka was an approximation based on an extremely flimsy calculation; yet most scholars chose to honour his suggested date, even until modern times. According to Malkovsky, Satyanand has convincingly demonstrated that Nimbarka and his immediate disciple Shrinivasa flourished well before Ramanuja (1017–1137 CE), arguing that Shrinivasa was a contemporary, or just after Sankaracarya (early 8th century). According to Ramnarace, summarising the available research, Nimbarka must be dated in the 7th century CE.

Biography
Little is known about Nimbarka's life. He is said to have been born into a Telugu Brahmin family on the 3rd bright half of the month Vaisakha and his parents were Jagannath, a Bhagavata saint, and his wife Sarasvati, who lived in Nimbapuri, which is in present-day Bellary district, Karnataka. However, some other versions suggest that the name of his parents were Aruna Muni and Jayanti Devi, who lived in a place near the river Godavari, which may be in Andhra Pradesh. Nimbarka's followers believe  him as the incarnation of Vishnu's weapon, Sudarshana Chakra.

It is believed that Nimbarka was given the name Niyamananda at his birth, but sometimes Bhaskara is considered as his birth name. During Nimbarka's early years, it is described that his family moved to Vrindavan, but there is no historical recorded account.

References

Bibliography
 
 
 
 

 
 
 
 
 

 
 

Hindu philosophers and theologians
12th-century Indian philosophers
Vaishnavite religious leaders
Medieval Hindu religious leaders
13th-century Indian philosophers
Vaishnava saints
Indian Hindu spiritual teachers